Matthew Might (born 24 July 1981) is a computer scientist, biologist, educator, and public health administrator.  Might serves as the director of the Hugh Kaul Precision Medicine Institute at the University of Alabama Birmingham.

Education and career 

Might received his bachelor's degree in 2001 and PhD in 2007 from Georgia Tech, both in computer science. In 2008, he joined the faculty at the University of Utah, where he worked as a professor of computer science and pharmaceutical chemistry until 2017, when he moved to Birmingham, Alabama. He was a visiting professor of biomedical informatics at Harvard Medical School.

Might is a White House strategist for the Precision Medicine Initiative, and is an advisor for the Undiagnosed Diseases Network. In 2017, he was given a Rare Impact Award by the National Organization for Rare Disorders.  Might is the Chief Scientific Officer of the NGLY1 Foundation.

Research 
Might's early work focused on cybersecurity. In recent years, he has transitioned to personalized medicine and bioinformatics.

Might wrote a blog post that went viral after his son, Bertrand, was diagnosed with NGLY1 deficiency, a rare disease that was previously unknown. This widespread publicity allowed him to locate several other patients and generate data on the characteristics of the disease.

Might used an artificial intelligence system he was developing called mediKanren to find out that Bertrand had Pseudomonas, during a time when he was in critical condition.

Personal life 
Might was married to Cristina Casanova in 2003 and they had three children. They divorced in 2021. His father was the president and CEO of Cable One, the cable-television division of the former Washington Post Company. His wife is the daughter of Manuel Casanova.

References

External links

Matt Might - Hugh Kaul Precision Medicine Institute, University of Alabama at Birmingham Google Scholar Profile
Might giving a TEDX talk on his move in precision medicine

Living people
Georgia Tech alumni
University of Utah faculty
University of Alabama faculty
1981 births